is a television network headquartered in Shizuoka Prefecture, Japan. The station, which began broadcasting on December 24, 1968, is an affiliate of Fuji News Network and Fuji Network System.

History
The main station (JOQH-TV; channel 35) was founded on February 13, 1968, and began broadcasting on December 24 of that year. Sometime after the station's sign on, a satellite station (JORH-TV; channel 34) began broadcasting from Hamamatsu. On March 23, 2005, the station began testing its digital terrestrial transmissions, which would formally commence on November 1 of that year, together with SDT and SATV. JOQH-TV broadcast simultaneously in both analog and digital formats until July 24, 2011, when JORH-TV permanently ceased broadcasting.

Programs
 Karakuri Samurai Sesshaawan 1
Teppen Sizuoka every weekday 15:50-16:50
Prime News Shizuoka
TV Terakoya

Syndicated shows from the TX Network 
Why Did You Come to Japan?
Aikatsu Planet!
Girls × Heroine
Yo-kai Watch (Until 2018)
Future Card Buddyfight (Until 2015)
Inazuma Eleven (Until 2012)
Bleach (Until 2011)

External links
 Official website 

1968 establishments in Japan
Japanese-language television stations
Fuji News Network
Mass media in Shizuoka (city)
Television channels and stations established in 1968
Television stations in Japan